Rocky Road is an American situation comedy that was originally broadcast on the Superstation WTBS cable network from September 3, 1984 to March 13, 1987.  Produced by Arthur Annecharico, the series follows three young siblings who run a beach-front ice cream parlor, and aired Monday nights as part of WTBS' line-up of original "family programming", which also included Down to Earth and Safe at Home.  During its three-season run, the series underwent several cast changes and starred Maylo McCaslin, Desiree Boschetti, Georg Olden, Lilly Moon, and Marcianne Warman.

Premise

The series centers on the three young Stuart siblings who live and work in a Pismo Beach boardwalk ice cream parlor that they inherit from their recently deceased parents.  The Stuart kids – Jessica, the 22-year-old eldest and legal guardian of her two younger siblings; Robbie, the 17-year-old middle sibling and self-appointed "idea man"; and Cindi, the 12-year-old youngest sibling – somehow find a way keep the struggling ice cream parlor afloat with the help (and interference) of their neighbors on the beach.

Jessica struggles to keep the family together while balancing a life of her own.  Robbie is a typical teenager whose "bright ideas" have a tendency to backfire.  And Cindi consistently finds adventures amidst a world of eccentric adults.  Suzie Quartermain, the boardwalk's young lifeguard, is a fun-loving "party girl" whose antics always keep things interesting.  Sandy Bradshaw, the boardwalk's police officer, is a bumbling young rookie who often finds himself in some mix-up.  Lucas Buchanan, who owns the boardwalk's bait shop, watches over the Stuart kids and reminisces about the escapades of his younger days, before eventually selling the bait shop to retired Marine officer, Frank Wilson, Sr. and his teenage son, Frank, Jr.

Characters
Jessica Stuart (Maylo McCaslin, season 1; Desiree Boschetti, seasons 2–3)
Robbie Stuart (Georg Olden)
Cindi Stuart (Lilly Moon, season 1; Marcianne Warman, seasons 2–3)
Suzie Quartermain (Kelly Ann Conn)
Sandy Bradshaw (Jim Menza, seasons 1–2)
Lucas Buchanan (Lewis Arquette, seasons 1–2)
Frank Wilson, Sr. (Fred Morsell, season 3)
Frank Wilson, Jr. (Joey Green, season 3)

Production
Rocky Road was created by Arthur Annecharico and was produced by his production company The Arthur Company for TBS.  An attempt at producing sitcoms on a budget, each episode of Rocky Road was estimated to cost $100,000 to produce, approximately ¼ the cost of network sitcoms of the time.  The series was filmed at Hollywood Center Studios in Los Angeles, California and premiered in its 7:05 pm time-slot on September 3, 1984 as part of TBS's Monday night line-up of its original shows Down to Earth (airing at 6:05 pm) and Safe at Home (airing at 6:35 pm) which, at the time, were both also produced by The Arthur Company.

The theme song was penned and performed by melodic rocker Guthrie Govan.

Episodes

Season 1 (1984)

Season 2 (1985–86)

Season 3 (1986–87)

Awards and nominations

References

External links
 
Rocky Road at RetroJunk.com

1984 American television series debuts
1987 American television series endings
1980s American sitcoms
English-language television shows
TBS (American TV channel) original programming
Television shows set in California
Television series by Studio T